Suna is the name of several inhabited localities in Russia.

Urban localities
Suna, Sunsky District, Kirov Oblast, an urban-type settlement in Sunsky District of Kirov Oblast

Rural localities
Suna, Republic of Karelia, a village in Kondopozhsky District of the Republic of Karelia
Suna, Zuyevsky District, Kirov Oblast, a selo in Sunsky Rural Okrug of Zuyevsky District of Kirov Oblast